Growth factor receptor-bound protein 2 also known as Grb2 is an adaptor protein involved in signal transduction/cell communication.  In humans, the GRB2 protein is encoded by the GRB2 gene.

The protein encoded by this gene binds receptors such as the epidermal growth factor receptor and contains one SH2 domain and two SH3 domains. Its two SH3 domains direct complex formation with proline-rich regions of other proteins, and its SH2 domain binds tyrosine phosphorylated sequences. This gene is similar to the sem-5 gene of Caenorhabditis elegans, which is involved in the signal transduction pathway. Two alternatively spliced transcript variants encoding different isoforms have been found for this gene.

Function and expression 

Grb2 is widely expressed and is essential for multiple cellular functions. Inhibition of Grb2 function impairs developmental processes in various organisms and blocks transformation and proliferation of various cell types. It is thus not surprising that targeted gene disruption of Grb2 in mice is lethal at an early embryonic stage. Grb2 is best known for its ability to link the epidermal growth factor receptor tyrosine kinase to the activation of Ras and its downstream kinases, ERK1,2.  Grb2 is composed of an SH2 domain flanked on each side by an SH3 domain. Grb2 has two closely related proteins with similar domain organizations, Gads and Grap.  Gads and Grap are expressed specifically in hematopoietic cells and function in the coordination of tyrosine kinase mediated signal transduction.

Domains 
The SH2 domain of Grb2 binds to phosphorylated tyrosine-containing peptides on receptors or scaffold proteins with a preference for pY-X-N-X, where X is generally a hydrophobic residue such as valine (see ).

The N-terminal SH3 domain binds to proline-rich peptides and can bind to the Ras-guanine exchange factor SOS.

The C-terminal SH3 domain binds to peptides conforming to a P-X-I/L/V/-D/N-R-X-X-K-P motif that allows it to specifically bind to proteins such as Gab-1.

Interactions
Grb2 has been shown to interact with:

 ADAM15, 
 Abl gene, 
 Arachidonate 5-lipoxygenase, 
 B-cell linker, 
 BCAR1, 
 BCR gene, 
 Beta-2 adrenergic receptor, 
 C-Met, 
 CBLB, 
 CD117, 
 CD22, 
 CD28, 
 CDKN1B, 
 CRK, 
 Cbl gene, 
 Colony stimulating factor 1 receptor, 
 DCTN1, 
 DNM1, 
 Dock180, 
 Dystroglycan, 
 EPH receptor A2, 
 ETV6, 
 Epidermal growth factor receptor, 
 Erythropoietin receptor, 
 FRS2, 
 Fas ligand, 
 GAB1, 
 GAB2, 
 Glycoprotein 130, 
 Granulocyte colony-stimulating factor receptor, 
 HER2/neu, 
 HNRNPC,
 Huntingtin, 
 INPP5D, 
 IRS1, 
 ITK, 
 Janus kinase 1, 
 Janus kinase 2, 
 KHDRBS1, 
 Linker of activated T cells, 
 Lymphocyte cytosolic protein 2, 
 MAP2, 
 MAP3K1 
 MAP4K1, 
 MED28, 
 MST1R, 
 MUC1, 
 Mitogen-activated protein kinase 9, 
 NCKIPSD, 
 NEU3, 
 PDGFRB, 
 PIK3R1, 
 PLCG1, 
 PRKAR1A, 
 PTK2, 
 PTPN11, 
 PTPN12, 
 PTPN1, 
 PTPN6, 
 PTPRA, 
 RAPGEF1, 
 RET proto-oncogene, 
 SH2B1, 
 SH3KBP1, 
 SHC1, 
 SOS1, 
 Src, 
 Syk, 
 TNK2, 
 TrkA, 
 VAV1, 
 VAV2, 
 VAV3,  and
 Wiskott-Aldrich syndrome protein.

See also
MAPK/ERK pathway

References

Further reading

External links
 
 The Grb2 protein page on The SH2 Website
 GeneCards entry for Grb2
 Human Protein Resource Database entry for Grb2
 Grb2 information on iHOP (Information Hyperlinked over Proteins)
GRB2 Info with links in the Cell Migration Gateway 

Proteins
Cell signaling
Signal transduction